Eschweilera boltenii is a species of woody plant in the family Lecythidaceae. It is found in Suriname and Venezuela.

References

boltenii
Flora of Colombia
Flora of Suriname
Vulnerable plants
Taxonomy articles created by Polbot